Events in the year 2007 in Norway, for no reason

Incumbents
 Monarch – Harald V
 Prime Minister – Jens Stoltenberg

Events

January
 13 January – The Greek ship Server breaks in half off the Norwegian coast, releasing over 200 tons of crude oil.
 15 January – TV 2 Nyhetskanalen starts broadcasting and becomes Norway's first 24-hour news channel.

February

March
 9 March – Gerd-Liv Valla resigns as the leader of the Norwegian Confederation of Trade Unions.
 10 March – Worker's Communist Party and Red Electoral Alliance, as well as their common youth organization Red Youth, merge to become the Red Party.
 12 March – In a radio interview on NRK P3, painter Marianne Aulie names two people who attempted to drug and rape her.

April

 3 April – A 41-year-old man admits to have killed Inger Johanne Apenes in 1978 as a 13-year-old.
 12 April – Eight people are killed when the Norwegian supply vessel Bourbon Dolphin capsized off the coast of Shetland and sank three days later while preparations were being made to tow her to shore.
 26–27 April – NATO summit in Oslo.
 30 April – A 35-year-old woman and her 7-year-old niece is found murdered in Overhalla, Nord-Trøndelag. The woman's ex-husband was later arrested for the murder.

May
 17 May – Docks located in Trondheim are completely destroyed in a fire.

June

July

August
 23 August – Per Ditlev-Simonsen resigned as mayor of Oslo after it was revealed that he held a secret Swiss bank account for which he did not pay the Norwegian wealth tax on.

September
 10 September – Municipal and county elections are held throughout the country.

October
 1 October – The merging of the oil businesses between the two Norwegian companies Norsk Hydro and Statoil, to form StatoilHydro, which was announced in December 2006, is completed.

November
 24 November – 3 people are killed and 24 are injured when a bus overturns in the Verdal municipality.
 28 November – Terra Securities files for bankruptcy as a result of the Terra Securities scandal.

December
 1 December – The Lofoten Mainland Connection officially opens, giving direct access to Lofoten from the surrounding municipalities.
 12 December – Statfjord oil spill: thousands of tonnes of oil were spilled into the North Sea during the loading of a tanker at the Statfjord oil field. The spill, estimated at 21,750 barrels (approx 3,000 metric tons), was Norway's second largest ever oil spill.
 30 December – Five people were seriously injured after an explosion in a residential building in Lund, Rogaland. The explosion occurred due to tampering with fireworks.

Undated

The Laid company is founded.

Popular culture

Sports

Music 

 Norway in the Eurovision Song Contest 2007

Film

2 February – The Junior Olsen Gang and the Silver Mine Mystery, directed by Arne Lindtner Næss, was released in Norway.
23 February – USA vs. Al-Arian, directed by Line Halvorsen, was released in Norway.
2 March – Mirush, directed by Marius Holst, was released in Norway.
30 March – On a Tightrope, directed by Petr Lom, was released in Norway. The film was awarded Grand Prix at the Chicago International Documentary Film Festival 2007.

Literature
The novella Andvake by Jon Fosse is published. In 2015, Fosse was awarded the Nordic Council Literature Prize, for Andvake, Olavs draumar and Kveldsvævd.

Television

Notable deaths

17 January – Tor Hagfors, scientist, radio astronomer and radar expert (b.1930)
17 January – Olav Per Sætren, politician (b.1935).
25 January – Knut Schmidt-Nielsen, comparative physiologist (b.1915)
29 January – Jens Marcussen, politician (b.1926)
11 February – Lorentz Eldjarn, biochemist and medical doctor (born 1920).
12 March – Hege Nerland, politician (b.1966)
21 March – Sven O. Høiby, journalist (b.1936)
13 April – Johan M. Nyland, politician (b.1931)
29 April – Arve Opsahl, film and stage actor, singer and stand-up comedian (b.1921)
29 April – Weiert Velle, veterinarian (b.1925).
23 May – Tron Øgrim, journalist, author and politician (b.1947)
24 May – Hans Bjørnstad, ski jumper and World Champion (b.1928)
27 May – Ole J. Kleppa, physical chemist (b.1920)
12 June – Ingolf Håkon Teigene, journalist and editor (b.1949)
15 June – Thor Gystad, politician (b.1919)
10 July – Jon Fossum, orienteer and politician (b.1923).
18 July – Sigurd Kalheim, politician (b.1927)
25 July – Bjørn Egge, military officer (b.1918)
27 July – Arnt Gudleik Hagen, politician (b.1928)
6 August (in the United States) – Atle Selberg, mathematician (b.1917).
16 August – Henrik Svensen, politician (b.1904)
21 August – Herman Hebler, printmaker and graphic artist (b.1911)
21 September – Hallgeir Brenden, cross country skier and double Olympic gold medallist (b.1928)
11 October – Stephan Tschudi-Madsen, art historian (b.1923)
12 October – Egil Bergsland, politician (b.1924)
16 October – Ragnar Pedersen, illustrator ("Joker"), magazine editor and revue writer (b 1942).
12 November – Tinius Nagell-Erichsen, publisher (b.1933)
16 November – Trond Kirkvaag, comedian, actor, imitator, screenwriter, author, director and television host (b.1946)
27 November – Svein Johannessen, chess player, became Norway's second International Master (b.1937)
13 December – Wiggo Hanssen, speed skater (b.1923)
30 December – Laila Kaland, politician (b.1939)
31 December – Sverre Helland, politician (b.1924)

Full date unknown
Finn Hødnebø, philologist (b.1919).
Ove Liavaag, civil servant (b.1938).
Tom Martinsen, photographer (b. 1943).
Alf Nordvang, actor and theatre director (b.1931).

See also

References

External links

 
Norway